David Garfield Hughes, born at Taunton, Somerset on 21 May 1934, played one first-class cricket match for Somerset in 1955.

Hughes was a right-handed lower-order batsman and a wicketkeeper, and his single match for Somerset's first team came about because of the (rare) unavailability of the regular wicketkeeper of the 1950s, Harold Stephenson. In the match against Nottinghamshire at County Ground, Taunton, he took one catch and made one stumping, and contributed two runs to Somerset's second innings after not batting in the first.

Hughes played for Somerset's second eleven in the Minor Counties and the Second Eleven Championship over many years, with his final appearance for the side in 1977. He also played Minor Counties cricket for Wiltshire in the 1960s.

References

External links

1934 births
English cricketers
Somerset cricketers
Living people
Sportspeople from Taunton
Wiltshire cricketers